Étienne-Pierre-Adrien Gois, also Étienne Gois le père, (1 January 1731 – 3 February 1823) was a French sculptor.

Biography
Gois initially studied under Étienne Jeaurat, then went into the workshop of Michelangelo Slodtz. He won the first grand prize for sculpture in 1757, on a bas-relief with the subject Tullie faisant enlever les morts. The prize money allowed Gois to travel to Rome. At the end of his stay at Palazzo Mancini, he executed a bust of la Douleur (Pain), a work that was presented three years later at the Paris Salon to great success.

Returning from Rome where he had fruitful studies, on 26 October 1765, he became an associate of the Académie royale de peinture et de sculpture, graduating on 23 February 1770. On 27 July 1776 the Academy appointed Gois assistant professor. He was then appointed Professor on 7 July 1781, replacing Louis-Jean-François Lagrenée (the Elder). In 1788 he gave the Academy a model he carefully executed of a flayed horse. He trained his son Edme-François-Étienne Gois who also became a sculptor.

References

 Simone Hoog (preface by Jean-Pierre Babelon, in collaboration with Roland Brossard), National Museum of Versailles. Sculptures. I-The museum, Réunion des Musées Nationaux, Paris, 1993.
 Ferdinand Hoefer, New General Biography, vol. 21, Paris, Firmin-Didot, 1858, p. 86.

1731 births
1823 deaths
18th-century French sculptors
French male sculptors
19th-century French sculptors
Artists from Paris
19th-century French male artists
18th-century French male artists